The Romanian football league system, also known as the football pyramid, refers to the system in Romanian club football that consists of several football leagues bound together hierarchically by promotion and relegation. The first three leagues are organized at a national level and consist of fully professional teams. Lower divisions are organized at county levels, with each county's football association controlling its respective leagues.

Reserve teams play in the same league system as their parent clubs.

National leagues 
The first three tiers are organized by nationwide federations: the first tier is overseen by the Romanian Professional Football League, while the second and third are run by the Romanian Football Federation.

A total of 114 teams play in the national leagues. Each of these clubs is fully professional and, in addition to playing in its respective league, has the right to compete in the Romanian Cup. They are also affiliated members of the Romanian Football Federation, and each has voting rights in the Federation's councils and elections, including in the election of the Federation president.

Liga I 
The Liga I is the highest level in the Romanian football league system and is operated by the Romanian Professional Football League. 14 professional teams compete for the title of Romanian Football Champion in a round-robin home and away, with 26 season matches in the regular season. After the conclusion of the regular season, the top 6 teams compete in a playoff for the League Champion title and the remaining European football spots, while the last 8 teams contest a play-out to avoid the relegation spots. The bottom two sides are relegated directly, while the 12th places teams plays a two-legged playoff against the 3rd placed team from Liga II. Both the playoff and play-out are round-robin home and away tournaments.

After the regular seasons, team points are halved and rounded down. Half-points are taken into account and act as the first tiebreaker at the end of the playoff. For example, if two teams finish the regular season with 57 and 56 points respectively, they will both start in the playoff with 28 points. If the two teams finish the playoffs with an equal number of points, the first team will always be ranked above the second, regardless of any other tiebreakers such as goals scored or direct results between the teams in question.

Liga II 
The Liga II is the second highest level in the Romanian football league system and is operated by the Romanian Football Federation. 20 teams compete in a round-robin home and away tournament. At the end of the season the first two teams are promoted directly, while the third team plays against the 12th side from Liga I in a two-legged play-off for the last spot in the next season's top flight.

The bottom 5 teams are relegated to the third league.

Liga III 
The Liga III is the third highest level in the Romanian football league system and is operated by the Romanian Football Federation. 80 teams are divided in 5 regional groups of 16 teams each, and compete in a round-robin home and away tournament consisting of 30 matches. The champion of each regional division is promoted to the next season's Liga II. The bottom four teams in each division is relegated. Additionally, among the five teams that finished on the 12th place, the one with the worst record is relegated to bring the total number of relegated sided to 21. To determine that team, separate standings are computed, using only the games played against clubs ranked 1st through 12th.

County leagues 
In contrast to the clubs from the national leagues, county league clubs are not directly affiliated to the Romanian Football Federation, but to the county's football association. While all national league clubs have the right of an individual vote, county football associations have a single vote.

Each of the 41 counties of Romania and Bucharest organize their own league system. The highest divisions in these system form the 42 series of Liga IV. Liga V is formed by each county's second tier. Eight counties organize a third tier. Each of these third level leagues represent one of the following counties: Arad, Brăila, Dâmbovița, Ialomița, Mureș, Prahova and Teleorman, Harghita, and they collectively form the Liga VI.

Similarly to the top three leagues in the country, county league clubs finishing the season at or near the top of their division may be eligible for promotion to a higher division. The 42 county champions (the winners of each county's Liga IV) have a chance of advancing to the third tier. These 42 teams are drawn to play among themselves in 21 two-legged playoffs, with the winner of each playoff getting promoted to Liga III.

Each county sends a team to compete in the Romanian Cup. To designate this club, counties organize their own knockout tournaments.

Current system

Women's pyramid 
A second-level league was first established in 2013. Before that there weren't enough women's football clubs for that and all played in the country's only league. Now, a three way league is under review and possible changes may be observed in the near future.

See also 

 League system
 Cupa României
 Supercupa României

References 

 
Football league systems in Europe